Early presidential elections were held in South Korea on 9 May 2017 following the impeachment and removal of Park Geun-hye. The elections were conducted in a single round, on a first-past-the-post basis, and had originally been scheduled for 20 December 2017. However, they were brought forward after the decision of the Constitutional Court on 10 March 2017 to uphold the National Assembly's impeachment of Park. Following procedures set out in the Constitution of South Korea, Prime Minister Hwang Kyo-ahn succeeded Park as the acting president. After Park was removed from office by the Constitutional Court's ruling, acting president Hwang announced he would not run for a term in his own right.

Opinion polling before April consistently placed the Democratic Party's candidate, Moon Jae-in, runner-up in the 2012 election, as the front-runner. Second place in the opinion polls was initially held by former UN Secretary-General Ban Ki-moon, who declined to run in February, followed by Ahn Hee-jung, whilst he lost the Democratic primaries to Moon. Support for People Party founder Ahn Cheol-soo then surged, threatening Moon's lead in the polls throughout early April, before descending to approximately equal that of Liberty Korea Party's candidate, Hong Jun-pyo, in final polls.

Moon won the election with 41 percent of the vote, defeating his nearest opponent, Hong, by a nearly 2-to-1 margin. Under the Constitution of South Korea, if a president dies, resigns, or is removed by impeachment, a new election must take place within 60 days. As a result, unlike previous presidential elections,  president-elect Moon took office immediately upon the confirmation of the result by the National Election Commission, with the inauguration at the National Assembly on the same day.

Background
Park Geun-hye of the conservative Saenuri Party (renamed just prior to the election in February 2017 as the Liberty Korea Party) won the previous presidential election in 2012, succeeding Lee Myung-bak of the same party.

The Saenuri Party lost the parliamentary election in April 2016, with opposition parties including liberal Democratic Party of Korea and People Party winning a majority in the National Assembly. Commentators described the result as leaving Park a lame duck president, as she may not run again under South Korea's one-term presidency rule. and the Nikkei Asian Review noted that, in the wake of her "crushing defeat", "rivals sense a prime opportunity to complete the power shift in the December 2017 presidential vote". The Korea Times stated: "The drama of deals and power struggles for next year's election has already begun."

Impeachment of President Park Geun-hye

On 9 December 2016, President Park was impeached by the National Assembly by a vote of 234 for and 56 against (with seven invalid votes and two abstentions) after her implication in the 2016 South Korean political scandal. The Constitutional Court reviewed the motion of impeachment.

On 10 March 2017, Park was formally removed from office, with a unanimous ruling by all eight of the Constitutional Court's justices supporting her impeachment. A presidential election would have to be held within 60 days. In the interim, Prime Minister Hwang Kyo-ahn succeeded Park and served out the remainder of the 18th term until election day.

The presidential election had previously been scheduled for 20 December, with Park barred from running due to the constitutional ban on any sort of presidential reelection. However, with Park's removal from office, the elections were brought forward to 9 May in order to ensure that a new president would be able to take office within 60 days of Park's removal, as required by the Constitution.

Registered candidates 

The six parties represented in the National Assembly are the social liberal Democratic Party of Korea, the conservative Liberty Korea Party, the centrist People Party, the center-right Bareun Party, the progressive Justice Party, and pro-Park Geun-hye conservative Saenuri Party.

Ballot numbers for party candidates were given according to the candidate's party seat distribution in the National Assembly. Ballot numbers for independent and minor party candidates were determined through a random lottery by the National Election Commission.

A record number of 15 candidates registered, out of which two withdrew before election day.

Nominations

Democratic Party

Candidate

Primary
Candidates were determined by an open primary of citizens who registered as a voter between February 15 to March 9, and March 12 to March 21. Overall, 2,144,840 people registered as a primary voter, making the 2017 primary the largest in Korean history.

The primary was conducted from March 22 to April 3, with the voting base divided by four regions: Honam, Yeongnam, Hoseo and Seoul Capital Area, Gangwon Province, and Jeju Province as a single region. 71.6% of the registered voters voted in the primary, putting the vote total at 1,642,640.

Candidates were:
Moon Jae-in, former party chairman (2015–16), member of the National Assembly for Busan Sasang District (2012–16), 2012 Democratic United Party presidential nominee
Ahn Hee-jung, Governor of South Chungcheong Province (2010–2018)
Choi Sung, Mayor of Goyang (2010–present), former member of the National Assembly for Goyang (2004–08)
Lee Jae-myung, Mayor of Seongnam (2010–present)

Results

Liberty Korea Party

Candidate

Primary
Candidate was determined by a combination of opinion polls, conducted between March 30 to March 31 (50%), and the votes cast by the delegates at the party convention held on March 31 (50%).
Candidates were:
Lee In-je, member of the National Assembly until 2016, former Minister of Labour, former Governor of Gyeonggi Province and 1997 presidential candidate
Hong Jun-pyo, incumbent governor of South Gyeongsang Province (2012–present)
Kim Kwan-yong, incumbent Governor of North Gyeongsang Province (2006–present)
Kim Jin-tae, member of the National Assembly for Chuncheon (2012–present)

Results

People's Party

Candidate

Primary

Candidate was chosen by an open primary (80%) and an opinion poll conducted between April 4 and 5 (20%). The primary was conducted through March 25 to April 4, with 7 regional primaries being held. Ahn Cheol-soo was declared winner of the primary on April 4.
The candidate were:
Ahn Cheol-soo, former party co-chairman (2016), former co-chairman of the New Politics Alliance for Democracy (March–July 2014), withdrawn presidential candidate in 2012, founder of AhnLab, Inc., member of the National Assembly for Nowon District (2013–present)
Sohn Hak-kyu, former member of the National Assembly for Seongnam (2011–12), former Governor of Gyeonggi Province (2002–06), former assemblyman for Gwangmyeong (1993–98, 2000–02)
Park Joo-seon, deputy speaker of the National Assembly (2016–present), member of the National Assembly (2000–2004, 2008–present)

Results

Bareun Party

Candidate

Primary
Candidate was determined by a combination of votes from an evaluation commission based on 4 debates, held in different region of the country (40%), votes from the party members (30%), and public opinion polls (30%).
Candidates were:
Yoo Seong-min, member of the National Assembly for Daegu (2004–present)
Nam Kyung-pil, incumbent Governor of Gyeonggi Province (2014–present)

Yoo Seong-min was nominated as the candidate of Baerun Party on March 28.

Results

Justice Party

Candidate

Primary
Candidates were determined by a closed voting of the party members. Candidates were:
Sim Sang-jung, Chairperson of the Justice Party (2015–present), member of the National Assembly for Goyang (2004– 2008, 2012–present) 
Kang Sang-goo, vice president of the Justice Party education institute

Sim Sang-jung was nominated as the candidate of the Justice Party on February 16.

Results

Notable non-candidates
 Hwang Kyo-ahn, acting President (2016–2017), Prime Minister (2015–2017), former Minister of Justice (2013–15) announced that he would not be running for the presidency on 15 March 2017.
 Kim Boo-kyum, member of the National Assembly for Daegu (2016–present), former member for Gunpo (2000–12), announced that he would not be running for the presidency on 7 February 2017.
 Ban Ki-moon, Secretary-General of the United Nations (2007–2016), was considering running as a non-partisan candidate but announced on 1 February 2017 that he would not be running for the presidency.
 Park Won-soon, Mayor of Seoul (2011–present), announced that he would not be running for the presidency on 26 January 2017.
 Oh Se-hoon, former Mayor of Seoul (2006–2011), announced that he would not be running for the presidency on 13 January 2017.
 Kim Moo-sung, former Chairman of the Saenuri Party (2014–2016), announced that he would not be running for the presidency on 24 November 2016.

Campaign

Official campaign
The official campaign begun on April 17 and ended on midnight of May 8.

Debates

Opinion polling
Opinion polls throughout 2017 showed Moon Jae-in as the leading candidate. Polls prior to the conclusion of the Democratic primary (which included his rivals to the nomination) had Moon at around 30% support, and polls conducted after he had won the primary showed generally consistent results of around 40% by April.

Polling showed a significant decline in support for Ahn Cheol-soo during April. While at the beginning of the month he was polling close to Moon, and even exceeded him in a few polls, by May his support had dropped to around 20%. This decline coincided with rising support for Hong Jun-pyo. By the time of the polling blackout period began on 3 May, Ahn and Hong were recording similar levels of support.

Exit polls
KBS, MBC, and SBS Terrestrial Broadcasting Exit Survey

Results 
Moon Jae-in of the Democratic Party of Korea won the plurality of the votes (41.09% in contrast to 24.04% won by his closest opponent Hong Jun-pyo), thus winning this election. He assumed the office as the President of South Korea immediately upon the confirmation of the results at 8:09 am on 10 May 2017 (Local time) and was inaugurated in the National Assembly at afternoon on the same day.

Moon's 17.1% margin of victory is the largest percentage margin for any liberal candidate since the beginning of free and fair direct elections in 1987.

By region

Major candidates 
Breakdown of votes by region for candidates with at least 1% of the total votes.

Minor candidates 
Breakdown of votes by region for candidates with less than 1% of the total votes.

Maps

References

 
2017 elections in South Korea
South Korea
Presidential elections in South Korea